Tochara creberrima is a species of moth of the family Erebidae first described by Francis Walker in 1858.

Distribution
It is found from India to Japan, New Guinea, the Carolines and Australia.

This species is more frequent in the lowlands.

References

Tochara
Moths of Asia
Moths of Japan
Moths described in 1858